John Warren McGuinness  (16 April 1972) is an English specialist Isle of Man TT professional solo motorcycle rider with 23 wins.

Until early 2017 he had a long association with Honda machines having factory support in road races like the Isle of Man TT, the North West 200 and the Macau Grand Prix, and also on the short tracks in the British Superstock and Supersport series.

In May 2017 McGuinness suffered serious injuries during practice for a race in Northern Ireland, ending his race participation for the remainder of the season. The accident occurred shortly after the release of his book.

In January 2018 he announced his intended-return as a TT rider, but had not sufficiently recovered to compete and in April announced a setback had prevented any competitive riding. He was able to complete a  Parade lap of the TT circuit on a Norton SG4 during the June 2018 event, but returned in August to win the 2018 Classic TT on the 500 cc Paton.

In May/June 2019 McGuinness made a return to the TT races, riding a large capacity Norton without success, but again renewed his association with smaller-capacity Hondas finishing in places 15 and 17 for the two Supersport 600 races, second place in the TT Zero electric race, and another win in August's Classic TT, part of the Manx Grand Prix race weeks.

In 2013, a left-hand bend on the Snaefell Mountain Course used for TT races before the top of Barregarrow on the main A3 road was named McGuinness's in recognition of his wins, together with Dave Molyneux who was similarly honoured.

He was part of a multi-rider motorcycle endurance-racing team called Honda TT Legends. In April 2016, the RAC announced McGuinness as recipient of the Segrave Trophy for 2015.

Early life
McGuinness was born and raised in Morecambe, Lancashire; his first experience of motorcycle road racing was in 1982, at age 10, with his father, who was competing in the Jurby races, in the Isle of Man.

His father owned a motorcycle repair shop but advised John to train as a bricklayer. Graduating in 1990, the resultant recession forced him into cockle fishing with his future father-in-law. McGuinness’ first race was an endurance road race at Aintree in 1990, at age 18.

Isle of Man TT
McGuinness’ first Isle of Man TT race was in 1996 on a Honda RS250R, finishing 15th. He took his first win in the Lightweight 250cc race three years later, the year he also became British 250 Champion.

2006
TT 2006 proved to be the best ever for McGuinness. He won three races (Senior, Superbike and Supersport) and he lowered the outright lap record four times during the festival. This all started in the TT Superbike race on 3 June, recording 17:42.53 from a standing start, then 17:41.71 on the second lap. His record lap stood at 127.933 mph to take in the 37.73 miles of the Mountain course, before another record-breaking performance in the Senior TT race on 9 June. John set a time of 17:39.95 from a standing start (already 1.76 seconds faster than a racing lap) and then blitzed the course in 17:29.26, 10.69 seconds faster than his opening lap and at an average speed of 129.451 mph.

2007

TT 2007 was also a great year with McGuinness taking wins in the Superbike TT and the Senior TT with lap and race records in both, the Senior lap record of 17:21.99 averaging 130.354 mph not only the outright lap record but the first to break the 130 mph barrier.

2008
The 2008 Isle of Man TT saw McGuinness struggle with reliability problems with his bikes, but did manage to pick up his 14th career win on the island, in the Senior TT. This win moves him alongside Mike Hailwood as the joint second-placed rider with most wins.

2009
McGuinness surpassed Hailwood's mark during the rain-delayed opening race of the 2009 Isle of Man TT on 8 June 2009. After Cameron Donald unofficially lapped the course at over 131 mph during practice, McGuinness broke the outright lap record by 0.7 seconds, taking the lap record to 17:21.29 or 130.442 mph. McGuinness held off team-mate Steve Plater by 18.11 seconds to record victory number fifteen. That was his only win and podium of the week; however, he did finish the week with a new outright lap record, and the fastest lap ever recorded with a 17:12.30 or 131.578 mph lap on the second lap of the Senior TT. A broken chain cost him a runaway victory, as Plater took his second career TT win.

He has also finished on the podium at the Macau Grand Prix.

McGuinness also contested the British Superstock championship, taking victory at Croft after his team-mate Steve Brogan and champion Alastair Seeley tangled in the final corner. This was his first short-circuit race win since 2001 in the British Supersport series, which he finished in third place overall.

2010

McGuinness was confirmed as part of the HM Plant Honda team for the North West 200 and Isle of Man TT events, also he is confirmed with Padgetts Motorcycles (Padgetts Grand Prix). Entered in the British superstock championship alongside new team mate's Glen Richards and Ian Hutchinson (road racing events).

At the 2010 North West 200 meeting, McGuinness took his fifth win around the 8.9-mile circuit when he took victory in the Superbike race and he followed this up with third in the feature race behind Alastair Seeley and Stuart Easton. He also took fifth and sixth in the two Supersport races and ninth in the Superstock.

2011
John McGuinness secured his 16th TT success by winning the six-lap Superbike TT in perfect conditions. The Honda rider from England came home 56 seconds ahead of runner-up Cameron Donald, with Gary Johnson third.
Keith Amor, Ballymoney's Michael Dunlop and Dan Stewart completed the top six leaderboard in the TT opener. New Zealander Bruce Anstey led for part of the race but retired on lap three after setting the fastest lap of the race at 131.05 mph. At the end of lap one McGuinness led by 0.5 seconds from Anstey, with Johnson third and Guy Martin fourth. Anstey assumed the lead after the second circuit, thanks to his lap at over 131 mph, with Martin up to third and Johnson fourth. A quick pitstop by McGuinness saw him move into the lead again and then Anstey retired his Padgetts Honda at Quarry Bends.
Morecambe-man McGuinness led Martin by 19 seconds after lap three and lap four.

He then went on to finish 5th in the Supersport TT Race 1 and scored 2nd places in both the Supersport TT Race 2 and Superstock TT Race before claiming his 17th TT win in the Senior TT

2012
John McGuinness was again representing the Honda spear-head at the 2012 TT.
During the practice week, times were close between the various favoured entrants, but McGuinness topped the practice leader board in the Superbike class.

Initially lying second behind Cameron Donald by 2/10ths of a second at the end of the opening lap in the Superbike race, McGuinness brought all his experience to bear over the second lap to lead the race by 2.16 seconds following the pit stop at the end of lap two. By the end of the third lap, the lead had increased to 6.30 seconds.
McGuinness continued his commanding performance throughout the remainder of the race, to clinch victory by 14.86 seconds by the end of the six laps.

John was congratulated on his Superbike triumph by his close friend, Mark Webber.

The Superstock TT had been until 2012, one of the few classes which had eluded McGuinness.
However, aboard the Padgett's Honda Fireblade, McGuinness rode what was widely regarded as an imperious performance to clinch his initial win in the class, and to raise his overall tally to 19 wins.

McGuinness then recorded a respectable 4th place in the first Supersport race, which he then followed up with 5th place in the second race in the Supersport class.

2013
In 2013, McGuinness won the 6-lap Senior TT, the final race of the event.  It was his sixth victory in the Senior TT, one short of the record of seven victories held by Mike Hailwood.  He also set the outright one lap record for the Mountain Course, 131.671 mph, in the final lap of the Superbike race in which he finished third during a week dominated by Ulsterman Michael Dunlop's four wins, reminiscent of Ian Hutchinson's five wins of 2010.

TT Zero

2012 also saw McGuinness make his debut in the TT Zero class. The involvement of McGuinness, together with that of Mugen was seen as a clear indication of the rising profile of a class of racing still in its infancy.

Riding the Mugen Motorsports experimental machine, McGuinness recorded a second place behind Michael Rutter on the MotoCzysz.

2013 again saw the same race result, with McGuinness second to winner Rutter, both riding similar machines to previously.

2014, a battered McGuinness who suffered a motocross accident weeks before the start of the Road Racing season, injuring his right wrist badly, and also suffered liver and other minor injuries. John struggled at his first international road racing meeting of the year the North West 200 and also posted disappointing results at the 2014 Isle of Man TT. On 4 June, John and Padgetts Racing announced he had withdrawn from the second Supersport race, but still raced the TT Zero class, and won it with an enormous lap record, 117.366 MP/H, beating the current Sidecar lap record, and came only 1.8 seconds shy to the current Lightweight 650cc Supertwin one lap record.

2017 Accident
In May 2017 McGuinness suffered serious injuries during practice for the Superbike race at the North West 200 event in Northern Ireland, causing broken vertebrae, ribs and compound fractures to his right lower leg bones, requiring surgeons to remove  and needing an external fixator cage to 'grow' new bone. McGuinness uses a spanner to regularly adjust the cage, creating a 1 millimetre gap across which the new bone growth occurs.

In July 2017, Honda Racing, a British business based in Louth, Lincolnshire which provided the new model Honda Fireblade under early development, confirmed the accident was caused by an electronics fault in the special race-kit when the engine unexpectedly accelerated.

During an interview in late August 2017, McGuinness confirmed his treatment would be ongoing until early 2018, and that he was unsure if he would have the physical capability or confidence to race 1000 cc Superbikes again, but he did not discount the possibility of riding in the smaller Supertwin, electric and classic categories.

2018 Return 
In January 2018 he announced his intended-return as a TT rider with Norton Motorcycles as team-mate to Josh Brookes, but his recovery was not complete and in April announced via social media that he had suffered a setback that prevented any competitive riding. He was able to complete a Parade lap of the TT circuit on a Norton SG4 during the June 2018 event, but returned in August to win the 2018 Classic TT on the 500 cc Paton.

2019 
In May/June 2019, McGuinness made a return to the TT races, riding Nortons in both Junior and large capacity races without success, but again renewed his association with Padgetts Hondas finishing in places 15 and 17 for the two Supersport 600 races, and second place in the TT Zero electric race with a Honda/Mugen. In August, he won the Classic TT on a Paton.

2022 
After the cancellation of the 2020 and 2021 events due to the COVID-19 pandemic, McGuinness next competed at the TT in 2022. He made his 100th TT start in the Superbike race, finishing 5th.

MotoGP
McGuinness entered four rounds of the MotoGP World Championship, one in 250 cc class and the other three in the 500 cc class, between 1997 and 2000 with a best result of 12th.

Personal life
McGuinness and wife Becky have two children. Living in Morecambe, he was given the Freedom of the Town in 2007. His first book, an autobiography entitled Built for Speed, was released in May 2017.

In July 2017 McGuinness was awarded an Honorary Fellowship from Myerscough College in Preston for his achievements in motorcycling. He attended the ceremony despite still recuperating from his extensive injuries as a result of his major crash two months previously.

McGuinness was appointed Member of the Order of the British Empire (MBE) in the 2021 New Year Honours for services to motorcycle racing.

References

External links

1972 births
Living people
250cc World Championship riders
500cc World Championship riders
British bricklayers
British Superbike Championship riders
English motorcycle racers
Isle of Man TT riders
Members of the Order of the British Empire
Segrave Trophy recipients
Sportspeople from Morecambe